Alexander Kozlovsky (born 5 May 1973, Velikiye Luki, Pskov Oblast) is a Russian political figure and deputy of the 7th and 8th State Dumas. 

After graduating from the Moscow Institute of Entrepreneurship and Law in 1997, Kozlovsky occupied various positions as commercial directors at several industrial enterprises. He started his political career in 2010 when he was appointed deputy of the Velikiye Luki City Duma of the 4th convocation. From 2011 to 2016, he was a deputy of the Pskov Oblast Assembly of the 5th convocation. In 2016, he was elected deputy of the 7th State Duma. In 2021, he was re-elected for the 8th State Duma.

References

1978 births
Living people
United Russia politicians
21st-century Russian politicians
Seventh convocation members of the State Duma (Russian Federation)
Eighth convocation members of the State Duma (Russian Federation)